Inna Yaitskaya (born 18 August 1979) is a Russian swimmer who won a bronze medal at the 1997 European Aquatics Championships. She also competed at the 1996 and 2000 Summer Olympics in three relay events, but did not reach the finals. 

She graduated from an Olympic boarding school in Samara.

References

1979 births
Living people
Swimmers at the 1996 Summer Olympics
Swimmers at the 2000 Summer Olympics
Russian female freestyle swimmers
Olympic swimmers of Russia
European Aquatics Championships medalists in swimming